Le Quellec is a surname, and may refer to;

Quellec derives from kellek which means ballsy in Breton. (cf. kell)

  - French ethnologist and anthropologist
 Vincent Le Quellec - French former track cyclist
  - French director
 Alain Le Quellec - Mayor of Quéménéven

References

External links
Distribution of the surname Quellec in France

Breton-language surnames